Metachanda is the sole genus in tribe Metachandini of moth subfamily Oecophorinae. Metachandini was originally described as family Metachandidae by Edward Meyrick in 1911, and at the time also contained the genus Chanystis, which is currently unplaced to tribe within Oecophorinae. It has also previously been described as tribe Metachandini of subfamily Gelechiinae.

Its type species is Metachanda thaleropis.

Species

Metachanda aldabrella
Metachanda anomalella
Metachanda argentinigrella
Metachanda astrapias
Metachanda autocentra
Metachanda baryscias
Metachanda benoistella
Metachanda borbonicella
Metachanda brachychlaena
Metachanda brunneopunctella
Metachanda cafrerella
Metachanda citrodesma
Metachanda classica
Metachanda coetivyella
Metachanda columnata
Metachanda cophaea
Metachanda crocozona
Metachanda crypsitricha
Metachanda declinata
Metachanda drypsolitha
Metachanda eophaea
Metachanda eucyrtella
Metachanda fimbriata
Metachanda fortunata
Metachanda fulgidella
Metachanda fumata
Metachanda gerberella
Metachanda glaciata
Metachanda gymnosopha
Metachanda hamonella
Metachanda heterobela
Metachanda holombra
Metachanda hugotella
Metachanda hydraula
Metachanda larochroa
Metachanda louvelella
Metachanda malevola
Metachanda miltospila
Metachanda mormodes
Metachanda nigromaculella
Metachanda noctivaga
Metachanda oncera
Metachanda oxyacma
Metachanda oxyphrontis
Metachanda phalarodora
Metachanda plumbaginella
Metachanda prodelta
Metachanda ptilodoxa
Metachanda reunionella
Metachanda rungsella
Metachanda rutenbergella
Metachanda sublevata
Metachanda taphrospila
Metachanda thaleropis  Meyrick, 1911
Metachanda trimetropa
Metachanda trisemanta
Metachanda trixantha

References

Catalog of Life

Oecophorinae
Moth genera
Taxa named by Edward Meyrick